The Malaysia Design Archive (MDA) is a non-profit private organization base in Kuala Lumpur oriented towards various projects to document, discuss, and preserve Malaysian Design. Its leading team members are Ezrena Marwan, Jac Sm Kee, and Simon Soon. Their core material collection concerns are graphic materials tracing the development of Malaysia from the period before independence(1957) until current times is housed at their office in Zhongshan Building. Access to the collection on site is free and also available via their official website as well as an online database.

See also
 List of tourist attractions in Malaysia

References

External links
 
 

2008 establishments in Malaysia
Archives in Malaysia
Buildings and structures in Kuala Lumpur
Culture of Kuala Lumpur
Business and industry archives
Design history